20th ADG Awards
January 31, 2016

Period Film:
The Revenant

Fantasy Film:
Mad Max: Fury Road

Contemporary Film:
The Martian

The 20th Art Directors Guild Awards, were given on January 31, 2016, honoring the best production designers of 2015.

Winners and nominees

Film
 Period Film:
 Jack Fisk – The Revenant
 Adam Stockhausen – Bridge of Spies
 Thomas E. Sanders – Crimson Peak
 Eve Stewart – The Danish Girl
 Mark Ricker – Trumbo

 Fantasy Film:
 Colin Gibson – Mad Max: Fury Road
 Dante Ferretti – Cinderella
 Edward Verreaux – Jurassic World
 Rick Carter & Darren Gilford – Star Wars: The Force Awakens
 Scott Chambliss – Tomorrowland

 Contemporary Film:
 Arthur Max – The Martian
 Mark Digby – Ex Machina
 Judy Becker – Joy
 Patrice Vermette – Sicario
 Dennis Gassner – Spectre

Television
 One-Hour Period or Fantasy Single-Camera Television Series
 Deborah Riley – Game of Thrones (for "Hardhome", "High Sparrow", "Unbowed, Unbent, Unbroken")
 Richard Berg – Gotham (for "Damned If You Do...", "Strike Force")
 Dan Bishop – Mad Men (for "Person to Person")
 Howard Cummings – The Knick (for "The Best with the Best to Get the Best", "Ten Knots")
 Donal Woods – Downton Abbey (for "A Moorland Holiday")

 One-Hour Contemporary Single-Camera Television Series
 Steve Arnold – House of Cards (for "Chapter 29", "Chapter 36")
 Tony Fanning – Better Call Saul (for "Five-O", "Marco", "RICO")
 John D. Kretschmer – Homeland (for "All About Allison", "The Litvinov Ruse", "The Tradition of Hospitality")
 Steve Saklad – Empire (for "Pilot")
 Karen Steward – True Detective (for "Night Finds You", "Omega Station", "The Western Book of the Dead")

Episode of a Half Hour Single-Camera Television Series
 Denise Pizzini – The Muppets (for "The Ex-Factor", "Pig’s in a Blackout")
 Claire Bennett – Transparent (for "The Book of Life", "Kina Hora", "Oscillate")
 James Gloster – Veep (for "Election Night", "Joint Session")
 Bruce Robert Hill – The Last Man on Earth (for "Alive in Tucson", "Is There Anybody Out There?", "Silent Night")
 Richard Toyon – Silicon Valley (for "Adult Content", "Homicide", "Sand Hill Shuffle")

 Multi-Camera Series
 John Shaffner – The Big Bang Theory (for "The Mystery Date Observation", "The Platonic Permutation", "The Skywalker Incursion")
 Greg Grande – Clipped (for "Dreamers", "Wi-Fi", "World's Rudest Barbershop")
 Stephan Olson – Truth Be Told (for "Big Black Coffee", "Member's Only", "Pilot")
 Glenda Rovello – 2 Broke Girls (for "And the Coming Out Party", "And the Escape Room", "And the Maybe Baby")
 John Shaffner – Mom (for "Fun Girl Stuff and Eternal Salvation", "Mashed Potatoes and a Little Nitrous", "Six Popes and Red Ferrari")

 Miniseries or Television Movie:
 Mark Worthington – American Horror Story: Hotel (for "Checking In")
 Pat Campbell – Wolf Hall (for "Three Card Trick")
 Michael Hanan – Tut (for "Betrayal", "Destiny", "Power")
 Clark Hunter – Bessie
 Warren Alan Young – Fargo (for "Before the Law", "Fear and Trembling", "Waiting for Dutch")

External links
 The winners and nominees on the official website

2014 film awards
2014 guild awards
Art Directors Guild Awards
2015 in American cinema